The Boston mayoral election of 1933 occurred on Tuesday, November 7, 1933. Former state treasurer Frederick Mansfield defeated five other candidates to be elected Mayor of Boston.

In 1918, the Massachusetts state legislature had passed legislation making the Mayor of Boston ineligible to serve consecutive terms. Thus, incumbent James Michael Curley was unable to run for re-election.

Mansfield was inaugurated on Monday, January 1, 1934.

Candidates
William J. Foley, District Attorney of Suffolk County since 1927
Frederick Mansfield, Treasurer and Receiver-General of Massachusetts from 1914 to 1915
Malcolm Nichols, Mayor of Boston from 1926 to 1930
Joseph F. O'Connell, member of the United States House of Representatives from 1907 to 1911
Henry Parkman Jr., member of the Massachusetts Senate since 1929, member of the Boston City Council from 1925 to 1929
Michael H. Sullivan, municipal court judge and former chairman of the Boston Finance Commission

Results

See also
List of mayors of Boston, Massachusetts

References

Further reading
 

Boston mayoral
Boston
1933
Non-partisan elections
1930s in Boston